Nadezhda Nikolayevna Rimskaya-Korsakova (  née Purgold (October 19 (N.S. October 31), 1848May 24, 1919) was a Russian pianist and composer as well as the wife of composer Nikolai Rimsky-Korsakov. She was also the mother of Russian musicologist Andrey Rimsky-Korsakov.

Life

Early years
Born Nadezhda Nikolayevna Purgold in St. Petersburg, she was the youngest of three daughters and the great-granddaughter of the 18th century jurist Johann Purgold. She started playing the piano at age nine, continuing her piano studies at the St. Petersburg Conservatory with Anton Gerke. She also studied music theory at the conservatory with Nikolai Zaremba and, later, composition and orchestration with Rimsky-Korsakov but did not graduate. During the 1860s and 1870s, she played piano at musical soirees at the home of Alexander Dargomyzhsky, becoming friends with Dargomyzhsky, Modest Mussorgsky and Alexander Borodin. Mussorgsky, who was fond of both Nadezhda and her sister Alexandra and would become close to both, called Nadezhda "our darling orchestra." She also played at gatherings in her home works of Mily Balakirev and of other members of "The Five." 

Among the works she played with the kuchka were Mussorgsky's operas Zhenitba (Marriage) and Boris Godunov, plus Nikolai Rimsky-Korsakov's The Maid of Pskov.

Marriage

She met Rimsky-Korsakov at Dargomyzhsky's home in the spring of 1868. Not long after their first meeting he wrote a song which he dedicated to her. He also started visiting her frequently, both at the Purgold home in St. Petersburg and at the family's summer residence in Lyesnov. She found in him an abundance of warmth and gentleness. He proposed to her in December 1871, and they married in July 1872. Mussorgsky was Rimsky-Korsakov's best man. The Rimsky-Korsakovs would eventually have seven children. Nadezhda was to become a musical as well as domestic partner with her husband, much as Clara Schumann had been with her own husband Robert. Beautiful, capable, strong-willed and far better trained musically than her husband at the time they married, she proved a good and most demanding critic of his work; her influence over him in musical matters was strong enough for Balakirev and Stasov to wonder sometimes whether she was leading him astray from their musical preferences. Although she gradually gave up composition after her marriage, she had a considerable influence on the creation of his first three operas. She travelled with her husband, attended rehearsals and proofread and arranged compositions by him and others. Years later, Nikolai Rimsky-Korsakov wrote: "The overture [from The Maid of Pskov], from the first note to the last one, belongs to a no-good girl whom I love very, very much."

Her enthusiasm for Nikolai Gogol's work became reflected in both her husband's compositions and those of his friends. On the day of their betrothal, she and Rimsky-Korsakov read Gogol's short story "May Night" together. Afterwards, she told him that he should write an opera based on it. A week or two later she wrote him, I've been reading yet another of Gogol's stories today, "The Fair at Sorochyntsi." This is good, too, and would even be suitable for an opera, but not for you; in any case, it's not like 'May Night.' As for that, it's so stuck in my head that nothing will drive it out. Either she or her sister Alexandra then suggested "The Fair at Sorochyntsi" to Mussorgsky. He did not act on it at the time, but a couple of years later, he reconsidered.

Nadezhda was also very prominent in the Rimsky-Korsakovs' social life, active in gatherings at the Rimsky-Korsakov household as both accompanist and performer. At one of these soirees, Pyotr Ilyich Tchaikovsky played the finale of his Little Russian Symphony. After hearing it, she begged the composer in tears to let her arrange it for piano duet. However, illness intervened and Tchaikovsky made the arrangement himself.

Outspokenness

Like her husband in his later years, Nadezhda's musical tastes became less progressive; she rated her son-in-law Maximilian Steinberg a greater composer than Igor Stravinsky. She could also be noticeably tactless about such matters. Stravinsky later wrote about one such incident that occurred at Rimsky-Korsakov's funeral:

This was not the only time she was not afraid to speak her mind. In matters regarding her husband she was fiercely loyal. When Anton Rubinstein reassumed the directorship of the St. Petersburg Conservatory in 1887 and started replacing Russian professors with foreign ones, Stasov was outraged at the thought of Rimsky-Korsakov kowtowing to "the Great Ruler." Stasov told Balakirev that he had written to Rimsky-Korsakov "that their relations with the Conservatory and Rubinstein is Unitarianism (and, on the part of Cui, unadulterated apostasy)...."

When Stasov's letter arrived, Rimsky-Korsakov was hard at work completing Borodin's opera Prince Igor. Nadezhda took it upon herself to answer Stasov:

Upon Rimsky-Korsakov's death in 1908, Nadezhda became the executrix of his literary and musical estates. This included the considerable job of editing and publishing his posthumous literary and musical works. These included his autobiography, My Musical Life, collections of articles and notes on music plus a part of his correspondence with friends. She spent the rest of her life preserving his legacy, among other things, protesting Sergei Diaghilev's use of music from Scheherazade and The Golden Cockerel for ballets. She died of smallpox in St. Petersburg (by then renamed Petrograd) at age 70. After her death, her son Andrei continued her efforts, writing a multi-volume study of his father's life and work.

Music

Arrangements
Dargomyzhsky taught Rimskaya-Korsakova how to reduce orchestral scores, a task for which she was especially talented and adept and which she would put to good use. Her transcriptions (for piano four-hands) include works by Dargomyzhsky, Rimsky-Korsakov, Tchaikovsky, Borodin and Glazunov. She also arranged the vocal scores for Rimsky-Korsakov's The Maid of Pskov and The Noblewoman Vera Sheloga, along with Borodin's Prince Igor in conjunction with Glazunov and her husband.

Original works
Autograph manuscripts survive of a symphonic tableau after Gogol, "The Bewitched Place" (Zakoldovannoye mesto), an opera Midsummer Night in piano-vocal score, piano pieces and songs. She completed "The Bewitched Place" a week or two before her marriage, orchestrating it the following year. She stopped composing after her marriage to Rimsky-Korsakov. This may have been partly from unfavorable comparison of her works to her husband's, but likely also due to family responsibilities.

Bibliography
She published two recollections of Dargomyzhsky, wrote a memoir of Mussorgsky and edited her husband's autobiography, My Musical Life.

References

Sources
Abraham, Gerald, ed. Stankey Sadie, The New Grove Dictionary of Music and Musicians, 20 vols. (London: Macmillan, 1980). .
Brown, David, The Master Musicians: Mussorgsky, His Life and Works (Oxford and New York: Oxford University Press, 2002). .
Brown, David, Tchaikovsky: The Early Years, 1840–1874 (New York: W.W. Norton & Company, Inc., 1978). .
Brown, Malcolm Hamrick, ed. Julie Anne Sadie and Rhian Samuel, The Norton/Grove Dictionary of Women Composers (New York and London: W.W. Norton & Company, 1995). .
Calvocoressi, M.D. and Gerald Abraham, Masters of Russian Music (New York: Tudor Publishing Company, 1944). ISBN n/a.
Orlova, Alexandra, Mussorgsky's Works and Days: a Biography in Documents (Bloomington and Indianapolis, 1983).
Rimsky-Korsakov, Nikolai, Letoppis Moyey Muzykalnoy Zhizni (St. Petersburg, 1909), published in English as My Musical Life (New York: Knopf, 1925, 3rd ed. 1942). ISBN n/a.
ed. Stankey Sadie, The New Grove Dictionary of Music and Musicians, Second Edition, 29 vols. (London: Macmillan, 2001). .
Frovola-Walker, Marina, "Rimsky Korsakov. Russian family of Musicians. (1) Nikolay Andreyevich Rimsky-Korsakov."
Neff, Lyle, "Rimsky Korsakov. Russian family of musicians. (2) Nadezda Rimskaya-Korsakova."

External links
 Tchaikovsky Research

1848 births
1919 deaths
Russian classical pianists
Russian women pianists
Russian women classical composers
Russian classical composers
Deaths from smallpox
Musicians from Saint Petersburg
Saint Petersburg Conservatory alumni
People from the Russian Empire of German descent
19th-century classical pianists
19th-century women musicians from the Russian Empire
20th-century Russian women musicians
Women classical pianists
19th-century women pianists
20th-century women pianists